Korppolaismäki (Finnish; Korpolaisbacken in Swedish) is a district of the city of Turku, in Finland. It is located to the south of the city centre, on the eastern side of the mouth of the river Aura. The district shares the new luxurious residential area of Majakkaranta with the neighbouring district of Pihlajaniemi.

The current population of Korppolaismäki is 349, and it is increasing at an annual rate of 0.29%. 19.20% of the district's population are under 15 years old, while 12.32% are over 65. The district's linguistic makeup is 87.68% Finnish, 10.32% Swedish, and 2.01% other languages.

See also
 Districts of Turku
 Districts of Turku by population

Districts of Turku